Brayan Damián Lucumí Lucumí (born 12 February 1994) is a Colombian professional footballer who plays as a winger for Venezuelan club Portuguesa.

Club career
Born in Villa Rica, Cauca, Lucumí was a Deportivo Cali youth graduate. He made his first team debut on 14 February 2013, coming on as a second-half substitute for Carlos Rentería in a 4–1 Copa Colombia away win against Dépor.

After failing to make a league appearance for the club, Lucumí was loaned to Llaneros for the 2014 season. Other loan moves to fellow Categoría Primera B sides Real Santander and Cúcuta Deportivo followed, before his permanent move to Mexican side Tigres UANL in 2017.

On 6 July 2017, after not making an appearance for Tigres, Lucumí returned to his home country and joined Deportivo Pasto in the Categoría Primera A. In January 2019, still owned by Tigres, he moved to fellow top-tier side Envigado.

On 8 July 2019, after featuring sparingly, Lucumí moved to Cortuluá in the second tier. On 17 November of the following year, he signed for Brazilian Série A side Coritiba on a short-term deal.

References

External links
Coritiba FBC profile 

1994 births
Living people
Sportspeople from Cauca Department
Colombian footballers
Association football wingers
Categoría Primera A players
Categoría Primera B players
Deportivo Cali footballers
Llaneros F.C. players
Real Santander footballers
Cúcuta Deportivo footballers
Deportivo Pasto footballers
Envigado F.C. players
Cortuluá footballers
Tigres UANL footballers
Campeonato Brasileiro Série A players
Coritiba Foot Ball Club players
Campeonato Brasileiro Série D players
Associação Portuguesa de Desportos players
Portuguesa F.C. players
Colombian expatriate footballers
Colombian expatriate sportspeople in Mexico
Colombian expatriate sportspeople in Brazil
Colombian expatriate sportspeople in Venezuela
Expatriate footballers in Mexico
Expatriate footballers in Brazil
Expatriate footballers in Venezuela
20th-century Colombian people
21st-century Colombian people